Izabela Marcisz (born 18 May 2000) is a Polish cross-country skier. She competed in the  Women's 10 kilometre classical, and Women's 15 kilometre skiathlon, at the 2022 Winter Olympics.

She competed in the 2021–22 FIS Cross-Country World Cup.

Cross-country skiing results
All results are sourced from the International Ski Federation (FIS).

Olympic Games

World Championships

World Cup

Season standings

References

External links

Living people
2000 births
Polish female cross-country skiers
Cross-country skiers at the 2022 Winter Olympics
Olympic cross-country skiers of Poland